Otto Hindrich (born 5 August 2002) is a Romanian professional footballer who plays as a goalkeeper for Nemzeti Bajnokság I club Kisvárda, on loan from Liga I club CFR Cluj.

Career statistics

Club

Honours 

CFR Cluj

 Liga I: 2019–20, 2021–22

References

External links 

 

2002 births
Living people
Sportspeople from Cluj-Napoca
Romanian sportspeople of Hungarian descent
Romanian people of Hungarian descent
Romanian people of German descent
Transylvanian Saxon people
Romanian footballers
Association football goalkeepers
Liga I players
CFR Cluj players
Liga II players
SSU Politehnica Timișoara players
Expatriate footballers in Hungary
Romanian expatriate sportspeople in Hungary
Nemzeti Bajnokság I players
Kisvárda FC players
Romania youth international footballers
Romania under-21 international footballers